Spacers is a 1986 play by Irish playwright Paul Mercier.

Synopsis 
The play follows a group of young supermarket employees as they rehearse a play written by the store's security guard for a local competition. The play they are rehearsing is titled Mikado - The Sequel. The play is an imitation of the Gilbert and Sullivan opera The Mikado and martial arts films. The play has been written by the supermarket's security guard.

Production History 
The play was first produced by Passion Machine in the SFX City Theatre in November 1986. The production was directed by Paul Mercier.

References 

1986 plays